Taroko Mall is a shopping mall in East District, Taichung, Taiwan that originally opened on September 27, 2001 as De An Mall but later changed its name to Taroko Mall on July 1, 2015. The total annual revenue in 2020 is approximately NT$2.18 billion.

History
 The mall opened on September 27, 2001 as De An Mall.
 The name of the mall was changed to Taroko Mall on July 1, 2015.

Gallery

See also
 List of tourist attractions in Taiwan
 Taroko Square
 Taroko Park

References

External links

 

2001 establishments in Taiwan
Shopping malls in Taichung
Shopping malls established in 2001